Low-level laser therapy (LLLT), cold laser therapy, or photobiomodulation (PBM) is a form of medicine that applies low-level (low-power) lasers or light-emitting diodes (LEDs) to the surface of the body. Whereas high-power lasers are used in laser medicine to cut or destroy tissue, it is claimed that application of low-power lasers relieves pain or stimulates and enhances cell function. The effects appear to be limited to a specified set of wavelengths, and administering LLLT below the dose range does not appear to be effective.

Mechanism 
Research is ongoing about the mechanism of LLLT. The effects of LLLT appear to be limited to a specified set of wavelengths of laser, and administering LLLT below the dose range does not appear to be effective. Photochemical reactions are well known in biological research, and LLLT make use of the first law in photochemistry (Grotthuss-Draper law): light must be absorbed by a chemical substance in order for a photochemical reaction to take place. In LLLT that chemical substance is represented by the respiratory enzyme cytochrome c oxidase which is involved in the electron transport chain in mitochondria, which is the generally accepted theory.

Medical uses 
Various LLLT devices have been promoted for use in treatment of several musculoskeletal conditions including carpal tunnel syndrome (CTS), fibromyalgia, osteoarthritis, and rheumatoid arthritis. They have also been promoted for temporomandibular joint disorders, wound healing, smoking cessation, and tuberculosis. LLLT appears to be effective for preventing oral mucositis in recipients of a stem cell transplant with chemotherapy. In other areas, evidence for LLLT remains conflicted. Some studies suggest that LLLT may be modestly effective, in relieving short-term pain for rheumatoid arthritis, osteoarthritis, chronic low back pain, acute and chronic neck pain, tendinopathy, and possibly, chronic joint disorders. The evidence for LLLT being useful in dentistry, and in the treatment of wound healing is unclear.

Veterinary use 
Veterinary clinics use cold laser devices to treat a wide variety of ailments, from arthritis to wounds, on dogs and cats. Very little research has been done on the effects of this treatment on animals. Brennen McKenzie, president of the Evidence-Based Veterinary Medicine Association, has stated that "research into cold laser in dogs and cats is sparse and generally low quality. Most studies are small and have minimal or uncertain controls for bias and error". While allowing that some studies show promising results, he reports that others do not. While believing that there is enough evidence to warrant further study, he concludes that there is not enough evidence to support routine clinical use of cold laser in animals.

Society and culture

History 
Hungarian physician and surgeon Endre Mester (1903-1984) is credited with the discovery of the biological effects of low power lasers,  which occurred a few years after the 1960 invention of the ruby laser and the 1961 invention of the helium–neon (HeNe) laser. Mester accidentally discovered that low-level ruby laser light could regrow hair during an attempt to replicate an experiment that showed that such lasers could reduce tumors in mice. The laser he was using was faulty and wasn't so powerful as he thought. It failed to affect the tumors, but he noticed that in the places where he had shaved the mice in order to do the experiments, the hair grew back more quickly on the treated mice than on those among the control group. He published those results in 1967. He went on to show that low level HeNe light could accelerate wound healing in mice.

By the 1970s, he was applying low level laser light to treat people with skin ulcers. In 1974, he founded the Laser Research Center at the Semmelweis Medical University in Budapest, and continued working there for the remainder of his life. His sons carried on his work and brought it to the United States. By 1987, companies selling lasers were claiming that they could treat pain, accelerate healing of sports injuries, and treat arthritis, but there was little evidence for this at that time. Mester originally called this approach "laser biostimulation'", but it soon became known as “low-level laser therapy" and with the adaptation of light emitting diodes by those studying this approach, it became known as "low-level light therapy", and to resolve confusion around the exact meaning of "low level", the term "photobiomodulation" arose.

Names 
Under the medical subject heading Low Level Light Therapy the terms following terms are accepted as alternative terms; LLLT, Laser Biostimulation, Laser Phototherapy, Low-Level Laser Therapy, Low-Power Laser Irradiation, Low-Power Laser Therapy, and Photobiomodulation Therapy. The term Photobiomodulation therapy is considered the preferred term by industry professionals. However LLLT has been marketed and researched under a number of other terms, including red light therapy, low-power laser therapy (LPLT), soft laser therapy, low-intensity laser therapy, low-energy laser therapy, cold laser therapy, bio-stimulation laser therapy, photo-biotherapy, therapeutic laser, and monochromatic infrared light energy (MIRE) therapy.  More specific applications sometimes have their own terms, for example when administered to acupuncture points, the procedure is called laser acupuncture. When applied to the head, LLLT may be known as transcranial photobiomodulation, transcranial near-infrared laser therapy (NILT), or transcranial low level light therapy.

Government Action 
The FDA filed a complaint for injunction in 2014, alleging that company QLaser PMA were marketing their devices as being able to treat “over 200 different diseases and disorders,” including cancer, cardiac arrest, deafness, diabetes, HIV/AIDS, macular degeneration, and venereal disease. This case resulted in a permanent injunction against the manufacture, marketing, sale, and distribution of those devices in 2015.

In 2017, the owner of QLaser, Robert Lytle, and two of QLaser's distributors were charged with a criminal conspiracy to commit fraud. Lytle pleaded guilty to one count of conspiracy to introduce misbranded medical devices into interstate commerce with the intent to defraud and mislead, and one count of criminal contempt in January 2018. Lytle was sentenced to serve 12 years in prison and made an initial restitution payment of $637,000. Lytle's conspirators were sentenced to 24 months and 15 months, respectively.

Reimbursement 
Blue Cross Blue Shield Association and Aetna provide coverage for the prevention of oral mucositis, but not any other reason. The Centers for Medicare and Medicaid Services does not provide coverage for LLLT. Cigna lists LLLT as "experimental, investigational, or unproven for any indication" and provides literature review summaries for a number of conditions.

Research

Musculoskeletal 

Evidence does not support a benefit in delayed-onset muscle soreness. It may be useful for muscle pain and injuries.
A 2008 Cochrane Library review concluded that LLLT has insufficient evidence for treatment of nonspecific low back pain, a finding echoed in a 2010 review of chronic low back pain. A 2015 review found benefit in nonspecific chronic low-back pain. LLLT may be useful in the treatment of both acute and chronic neck pain. In 2013, however, a systematic review and meta-analysis of LLLT for neck pain indicated that the benefit was not of significant importance and that the evidence had a high risk of bias.

There are tentative data that LLLT is useful in the short-term treatment of pain caused by rheumatoid arthritis, and possibly chronic joint disorders. A 2019 systematic review and meta-analysis found evidence for pain reduction in osteoarthritis. While it does not appear to improve pain in temporomandibular disorders, it may improve function.

There is tentative evidence of benefit in tendinopathy. A 2014 review found benefit in shoulder tendinopathy. A 2014 Cochrane review found tentative evidence that it may help in frozen shoulders.

Mouth 
Similarly, the use of lasers to treat chronic periodontitis and to speed healing of infections around dental implants is suggested, but there is insufficient evidence to indicate a use superior to traditional practices. There is tentative evidence for dentin hypersensitivity. It does not appear to be useful for orthodontic pain LLLT might be useful for wisdom tooth extraction (complications).

Hair loss 
LLLT has been studied as a treatment for hair loss; a review in 2012 found little evidence to support the use of lasers to treat hair loss. A 2014 review found tentative evidence for benefit for lasers, while another 2014 review concluded that the results were mixed, had a high risk of bias, and that its effectiveness was unclear. A 2015 review found tentative evidence of benefit. Additionally, a 2017 review of clinical trials found 10 of 11 trials reviewed "demonstrated significant improvement of androgenic alopecia in comparison to baseline or controls when treated with LLLT."

Brain injuries 
LLLT has been studied for traumatic brain injury (TBI) and stroke among other conditions. When applied to the head it is known as transcranial photobiomodulation or transcranial low level light therapy.

Cancer treatment side effects 
LLLT has been studied as a way to reduce pain and swelling in breast-cancer related lymphedema.

Stem cells 
An ongoing area of research is the application of LLLT for increasing cell proliferation, including stem cells.

See also 

 Photomedicine
 Light therapy
 Blood irradiation therapy
 Photorejuvenation

References 

Laser medicine
Alternative medicine
Bioelectromagnetic-based therapies
Light therapy
Hungarian inventions